The 19th Infantry Brigade was a formation of the Royal Hungarian Army that participated in the Axis invasion of Yugoslavia during World War II.

The 19th Infantry Brigade was formed in Miskolc on January 23, 1939.

The 19th Infantry Brigade was redesignated 19th Light Division 17 February 1942.

Commanders
19th Infantry Brigade
 Brigadier General József Csatary (23 Jan 1939 - 1 Aug 1941)
 Brigadier General Gyözö Beleznay (1 Aug 1941 - 17 Feb 1942)
19th Light Division
 Brigadier General Gyözö Beleznay (17 Feb 1942 - 1 May 1942)
 Colonel László Deák (1 May 1942 - ? Aug 1942)
 Colonel Ferenc Szász (? Aug 1942 - ? Sep 1942)
 Brigadier General Aladár Asztalossy (1 Oct 1942 - 1 June 1943)

Notes

References

 

Military units and formations of Hungary in World War II